Cambria County is a county in the Commonwealth of Pennsylvania. As of the 2020 census, the population was 133,472. Its county seat is Ebensburg. The county was created on March 26, 1804, from parts of Bedford, Huntingdon, and Somerset Counties and later organized in 1807. It was named for the nation of Wales, which in Latin is known as "Cambria".

Cambria County comprises the Johnstown, PA metropolitan statistical area, which is also included in the Johnstown-Somerset, PA combined statistical area.

Geography
Cambria has a warm-summer humid continental climate (Dfb) and average monthly temperatures in downtown Johnstown range from 27.8 °F in January to 71.0 °F in July, while in Ebensburg they range from 23.9 °F in January to 67.7 °F in July. PRISM Climate Group, Oregon State U

Adjacent counties
Clearfield County (north)
Blair County (east)
Bedford County (southeast)
Somerset County (south)
Westmoreland County (southwest)
Indiana County (west)

National protected areas
 Allegheny Portage Railroad National Historic Site (part)
 Johnstown Flood National Memorial

Major highways

Demographics

As of the census of 2000, there were 152,598 people, 60,531 households, and 40,616 families residing in the county. The population density was 222 people per square mile (86 per km2). There were 65,796 housing units at an average density of 96 per square mile (37 per km2). The racial makeup of the county was 95.80% White, 2.83% Black or African American, 0.09% Native American, 0.38% Asian, 0.02% Pacific Islander, 0.25% from other races, and 0.64% from two or more races. 0.89% of the population were Hispanic or Latino of any race. 27.7% were of German, 10.2% Irish, 10.1% Italian, 10.0% Polish, 6.5% Slovak, 6.2% American and 5.6% English ancestry.

There were 60,531 households, out of which 27.00% had children under the age of 18 living with them, 52.80% were married couples living together, 10.40% had a female householder with no husband present, and 32.90% were non-families. 29.80% of all households were made up of individuals, and 15.60% had someone living alone who was 65 years of age or older. The average household size was 2.38 and the average family size was 2.96.

In the county, the population was spread out, with 21.00% under the age of 18, 9.00% from 18 to 24, 26.20% from 25 to 44, 24.10% from 45 to 64, and 19.70% who were 65 years of age or older. The median age was 41 years. For every 100 females there were 94.20 males. For every 100 females age 18 and over, there were 91.30 males.

2020 Census

Law and government

|}

As of November 7, 2022, there are 86,213 registered voters in Cambria County.
 Republican: 42,609 (49.42%)
 Democratic: 34,244 (39.72%)
 Independent: 7,011 (8.13%)
 Third Party: 2,349 (2.72%)

Cambria has been a swing county in statewide elections since the 1990s, with all four statewide winners carrying it in 2008. Cambria County is one of Pennsylvania's most competitive counties. That is primarily due to its mixed urban-rural ratio.

Al Gore received 50.3% of the county vote to 46.4% for George W. Bush in 2000, but Bush carried it with 50.8% of the vote to 48.7% for John Kerry in 2004–only the third time since 1928 that the county had supported a Republican for president. Cambria returned to the Democratic Presidential column in 2008, with Barack Obama receiving 49.4% of the vote to 48.7% for John McCain. In 2011 the GOP won a majority on the county commissioners board and in 2012 gave Mitt Romney 58.1% of the vote to Barack Obama's 40.1%.

In 2016, Donald Trump carried the county with 66.5% of the vote to Hillary Clinton's 29.7%, winning the county by 36.8%. This broke the modern record for margin of victory in the county of 35.4% set by Lyndon Johnson in 1964. Four years later, Trump won the county with an even bigger margin of 37.34%.

County commissioners

Other county offices

State Senate

State House of Representatives

United States House of Representatives

United States Senate

Public services 
Waste management for the county is regulated by the Cambria County Solid Waste Management Authority.

Education

Colleges and universities
Christ the Saviour Seminary, Johnstown
Mount Aloysius College
Saint Francis University
University of Pittsburgh at Johnstown University of Pittsburgh Johnstown | University of Pittsburgh

Community, junior, and technical colleges

Cambria-Rowe Business College
Pennsylvania Highlands Community College
Commonwealth Technical Institute, Johnstown
Wrightco Technologies Technical Training Institute, Ebensburg

Public school districts
 Blacklick Valley School District
 Cambria Heights School District
 Central Cambria School District
 Conemaugh Valley School District
 Ferndale Area School District
 Forest Hills School District
 Glendale School District (also in Clearfield County)
 Greater Johnstown School District
 Northern Cambria School District
 Penn Cambria School District (also in Blair County)
 Portage Area School District
 Richland School District
 Westmont Hilltop School District
 Windber Area School District (also in Somerset County)

Private schools
All Saints Catholic School, Cresson
Appalachian Youth Service
Arbutus Park Manor, Johnstown
Bishop Carroll High School (Ebensburg, Pennsylvania)
Bishop McCort High School, Johnstown
Cambria County Child Development Center, Ebensburg
Cambria County Christian School, Johnstown
Carousel Learning & Development Center, Johnstown
Cathedral Catholic Academy, Johnstown
Center for Achievement
Childrens Express Inc., Cresson
Easter Seal Day Care Center, Johnstown
Genesis Christian Academy, Johnstown
Holy Name School, Ebensburg
Houston House, Johnstown
Laurel Highlands Therapeutic Academy, Ebensburg
Little Learning Lamp, Johnstown
Northern Cambria Catholic School, Nicktown
Occupational Preparation School, Ebensburg
Our Mother of Sorrow School, Johnstown
Richland Academy Montessori School, Johnstown
Sean Davison School of Driving, Lilly
St Michael's School, Loretto
St Sophia Orthodox Christian Academy, Johnstown
According to the Pennsylvania Department of Education's Ed Names and Addresses, July 1, 2015

Vocational/Technical schools
Admiral Peary Vocational Technical School
Greater Johnstown Career & Technology Center

Recreation
There are two Pennsylvania state parks in Cambria County.
Prince Gallitzin State Park is named for Demetrius Gallitzin, a Russian nobleman turned Catholic priest who was instrumental in the settlement of Cambria County.
Laurel Ridge State Park surrounds a 70-mile (113-km) hiking trail that begins in Cambria County and ends at Ohiopyle State Park in Fayette County.

Communities

Under Pennsylvania law, there are four types of incorporated municipalities: cities, boroughs, townships, and, in at most two cases, towns. The following cities, boroughs and townships are located in Cambria County:

City
Johnstown

Boroughs

Ashville
Brownstown
Carrolltown
Cassandra
Chest Springs
Cresson
Daisytown
Dale
East Conemaugh
Ebensburg (county seat)
Ehrenfeld
Ferndale
Franklin
Gallitzin
Geistown
Hastings
Lilly
Lorain
Loretto
Nanty Glo
Northern Cambria
Patton
Portage
Sankertown
Scalp Level
South Fork
Southmont
Summerhill
Tunnelhill (partly in Blair County)
Vintondale
Westmont
Wilmore

Townships

Adams
Allegheny
Barr
Blacklick
Cambria
Chest
Clearfield
Conemaugh
Cresson
Croyle
Dean
East Carroll
East Taylor
Elder
Gallitzin
Jackson
Lower Yoder
Middle Taylor
Munster
Portage
Reade
Richland
Stonycreek
Summerhill
Susquehanna
Upper Yoder
Washington
West Carroll
West Taylor
White

Census-designated places
Census-designated places are geographical areas designated by the U.S. Census Bureau for the purposes of compiling demographic data. They are not actual jurisdictions under Pennsylvania law. Other unincorporated communities, such as villages, may be listed here as well.

Beaverdale
Belmont
Blandburg
Colver
Dunlo
Elim
Mundys Corner
Oakland
Revloc
Riverside
Salix
Sidman
Spring Hill
St. Michael
University of Pittsburgh Johnstown
Vinco
Westwood

Unincorporated communities

Belsano
Coupon
Dean
Dysart
Elmora
Elton
Emeigh
Fallentimber
Flinton
Garmantown
Glasgow
Hollentown
Marsteller
Mineral Point
New Germany
Nicktown
Parkhill
Saint Benedict
Saint Boniface
Twin Rocks

Population ranking
The population ranking of the following table is based on the 2010 census of Cambria County.

† county seat

See also
 Cambria Somerset Authority - Water supply authority for Cambria County and Somerset County
 National Register of Historic Places listings in Cambria County, Pennsylvania

References

External links

Cambria County official website
Cambria County Historical Society housed in the A.W. Buck House
Pennsylvania Department of Transportation Map of Cambria County showing cities, boroughs, unincorporated villages, and townships.

1807 establishments in Pennsylvania
 
Counties of Appalachia
Laurel Highlands
Populated places established in 1807